Gampalage Shehan Naveendra De Fonseka Gunawarna Jayasuriya, or commonly Shehan Jayasuriya (born 12 September 1991), is a professional Sri Lankan cricketer, who played for Chilaw Marians in Sri Lankan domestic cricket. He is a quick-scoring left-handed batsman and a right-arm off-break bowler. He was born in Colombo, and attended Prince of Wales College, Moratuwa. He announced his retirement from all forms of cricket in Sri Lanka on 8 January 2021 because of him moving to United States with his family.

Personal life
Jayasuriya is married to Sri Lankan actress Kaveesha Kavindi where the wedding was celebrated on 23 September 2020 in New York, USA. She is the daughter of retired Sri Lankan film actress Dilani Abeywardana.

Jayasuriya announced his retirement from all forms of cricket on 8 January 2021 because of him moving to USA with his family and spending the rest of his life there. In June 2021, Jayasuriya was selected in the players' draft ahead of the Minor League Cricket tournament.

Domestic career
Jayasuriya made his first-class cricket debut in October 2009 for Police Sports Club against Moratuwa Sports Club. His highest first-class score is 237, which he made off 218 balls for Chilaw Marians in their 378-run victory over Bloomfield in 2016-17. In 2017-18, against Ragama, he opened both batting and bowling and dominated the match, taking 7 for 22 and 3 for 66 and scoring 80 in an innings victory; no other batsman in the match reached 40.

In March 2018, he was named in Colombo's squad for the 2017–18 Super Four Provincial Tournament. The following month, he was also named in Colombo's squad for the 2018 Super Provincial One Day Tournament. He was the leading run-scorer for Colombo in the tournament, with 326 runs in seven matches, and was named as the player of the series.

In August 2018, he was named in Colombo's squad the 2018 SLC T20 League. In February 2019, Sri Lanka Cricket named him as the Player of the Tournament for the 2017–18 Premier Limited Overs Tournament. In March 2019, he was named in Colombo's squad for the 2019 Super Provincial One Day Tournament.

In January 2020, in the opening round of matches in the 2019–20 SLC Twenty20 Tournament, he scored a century for Chilaw Marians Cricket Club. He finished the tournament as the leading run-scorer in the competition, with 385 runs in eight matches.

In October 2020, he was drafted by the Galle Gladiators for the inaugural edition of the Lanka Premier League.

International career
As an all rounder, Jayasuriya made his Twenty20 International debut for Sri Lanka against Pakistan on 1 August 2015. He scored 40 runs off 32 balls including 3 fours and 2 sixes on his debut and took his first international wicket by bowling Shahid Afridi out. However, the match ended with a defeat for Sri Lanka. He made his One Day International debut for Sri Lanka against the West Indies on 1 November 2015, he got out for nought in his first innings, bowled by Sunil Narine.

In August 2019, he was named in a twenty-two man squad for Sri Lanka's Test series against New Zealand. However, he was not named in the final fifteen-man squad for the first Test. He was included to the T20I series against New Zealand in September 2019. He played in first two T20Is with modest results. In the last over of second T20I, he had a collision with Kusal Mendis at the boundary line. Jayasuriya was running from long on, and Mendis from midwicket, in order to intercept an aerial Mitchell Santner, he tripped up by the onrushing Mendis, and sent crashing into the boundary. Both players picked up knee injuries and rested from the third T20I.
In September 2019, he successfully got the spot in Sri Lanka's Twenty20 International (T20I) squad for the series against Pakistan.

During the second ODI against Pakistan on 30 September 2019, Jayasuriya scored his maiden ODI fifty. He got out for 96 runs in the match. However, along with Dasun Shanaka, they put up a record sixth-wicket stand of 177. This is the highest partnership against Pakistan in ODIs. However, Sri Lanka lost the match by 67 runs.

Post-Sri Lanka career
On 8 January 2021, Jayasuriya announced his retirement from all forms of cricket in Sri Lanka. In June 2021, he was selected to take part in the Minor League Cricket tournament in the United States following the players' draft.

Note
 Shehan Jayasuriya is not related in any way to former Sri Lankan cricket captain, Sanath Jayasuriya.

References

External links
 
 

1991 births
Living people
Sri Lankan cricketers
Sri Lanka One Day International cricketers
Sri Lanka Twenty20 International cricketers
Sri Lanka Police Sports Club cricketers
Cricketers from Colombo
Saracens Sports Club cricketers
Moors Sports Club cricketers
Ruhuna cricketers
Wayamba United cricketers
Chilaw Marians Cricket Club cricketers
Chattogram Challengers cricketers
Asian Games medalists in cricket
Cricketers at the 2014 Asian Games
Colombo Commandos cricketers
Prime Bank Cricket Club cricketers
Asian Games gold medalists for Sri Lanka
Sylhet Strikers cricketers
Khulna Tigers cricketers
Medalists at the 2014 Asian Games
Alumni of Prince of Wales' College, Moratuwa
Galle Gladiators cricketers